St George in the East, historically known as Wapping-Stepney, was an ancient parish, in the London Borough of Tower Hamlets, England. The place name is no longer widely used. 

Ancient parish areas were historically the same for both civil and ecclesiastical (church) functions, and while St George in the East is no longer a civil parish there is still a smaller continuing ecclesiastical parish. The church, crypts and second floor outreach mission are open and holds regular services, as well as community organising and social justice campaigns.

History
The parish was largely rural at the time of its creation, the main settlement a Hamlet (administrative sub-division of Stepney) and former farm estate known as Wapping-Stepney, or Wapping. The parish church of St George in the East was completed in 1729 by the Commission for Building Fifty New Churches. To distinguish it from other parishes in and near London with the same name, an addition was made which denoted it as "in the East" as a suffix which reflected it was then an eastern suburb of London.

In 1800, work on constructing the London Docks had begun, with parts of Wapping demolished. In 1820 St. George in the East was at the height of its prosperity with wealthy merchants and traders living and building in the parish. The London Docks caused a large influx of unskilled labour and brought poverty with the population growing dense and causing outbreaks of cholera in 1849, 1855, and in 1866.

In the 1930s, Sir Oswald Mosley British Union of Fascists organized a march east down Cable Street to Stepney with 3,000 supporters in October 1936, which was blocked by protesters’ barricades at the junction of Cable Street and Christian Street and was known after as the Battle of Cable Street, a mural painted on the side of the former St George's vestry hall shows this event.

After the devastating bomb damage during the Second World War, St George in the East was redeveloped into an almost entirely residential area, which included high-rise flats in tower block style built in the 1970s.

Geography
Much of the former northern boundary of the parish was with Mile End Old Town ran alongside Commercial Road. In the west the boundary with Whitechapel fell just short of Back Church Lane. The parish of Wapping bordered it to the south, with Wapping forming a buffer in the west and south, beyond which are for example St Botolph Without Aldgate, colloquially Aldgate in the tube system.

Shadwell and St George's East railway station on the London and Blackwall was within the parish of St George, as was a large part of the London Docks, which have since been filled in. 
There is an architectural Conservation Area covering the area around the Parish church and Town Hall.

Governance

St George in the East, in early decades especially also referred to as St George Middlesex; had for centuries been part of Stepney in the Tower division of the Ossulstone hundred of Middlesex. It was split off as a separate combined secular and ecclesiastical parish as all were in 1729 and had a population of 47,157 by 1881. Aside from co-government with London County Council from its 1889 inception, local government was through the Vestry of the Parish of St George from 1855 to 1900. Following the Poor Law Amendment Act 1834, it was constituted a Poor Law unit for rate collection and administration (including distributions) from 1836.

The parish vestry became a local authority in the Metropolis in 1855, nominating one member to the co-governing Metropolitan Board of Works.

Under the Metropolis Management Act 1855 any parish that exceeded 2,000 ratepayers was to be divided into wards; as such the incorporated vestry of St George in the East was divided into two wards (electing vestrymen): No. 1 or North (18) and No. 2 or South (18).

The board of works was replaced by the directly elected London County Council in 1889 and its area of responsibly became the County of London. St George in the East became part of the Metropolitan Borough of Stepney in 1900 and was abolished as a civil parish in 1927. The vestry hall was on Cable Street and today has non-governmental use.

Stepney Borough took over the defunct civil parish in 1927, then under the new model of government, Tower Hamlets Borough Council was assigned its functions in 1965.

Although the area is no longer a civil parish, there remains a smaller ecclesiastical (church) parish.

Relevant Members of Parliament
It was part of the Middlesex two-member (MP) constituency and then that of soon similarly under-represented Tower Hamlets from 1832 to 1885. A St George seat spanned 1885 to 1918, under the Redistribution of Seats Act 1885 during which time overcrowding fell. Larger Whitechapel and St Georges, covered the next years to 1950. It was locally replaced with seat Stepney, amended in 1950 to become Stepney and Poplar, amended in 1983 to become locally Bethnal Green and Stepney then falling almost all in Poplar and Limehouse.

Notable residents
Lottie Collins, musical hall singer
Ted "Kid" Lewis, former World Welterweight boxing champion

References

Areas of London
History of the London Borough of Tower Hamlets
Parishes governed by vestries (Metropolis)
Former civil parishes in London
Shadwell